Barry John Archer (born 21 June 1977) is an Irish cricketer. He is a left-handed batsman and a right-arm medium pace bowler.

He made his debut for Ireland against Scotland in June 1999 and has gone on to play for them 22 times to date, though he has not been selected since the European Championship of July 2000. Three of his games for Ireland had first-class status and a further three had List A status.

References

External links
 CricketEurope Stats Zone profile
 

1977 births
Living people
Irish cricketers
Cricketers from Dublin (city)